David Andrew McNaught (born 24 March 1988) is a Scottish footballer who played 'senior' for Clyde and Dumbarton.

References

1988 births
Scottish footballers
Dumbarton F.C. players
Clyde F.C. players
Scottish Football League players
Living people
Association football forwards